New Franken is an unincorporated community in the towns of Scott, Green Bay, and Humboldt in Brown County, Wisconsin, United States. It is part of the Green Bay Metropolitan Statistical Area.

Notable person
Dave Zuidmulder, NFL football player, was born in New Franken.

References 

Unincorporated communities in Wisconsin
Unincorporated communities in Brown County, Wisconsin
Green Bay metropolitan area